This is a list of typical Jeolla dishes found in Korean cuisine.

Main dishes
Jeonju Bibimbap (전주비빔밥), literally "mixed rice of Jeonju"
Kongnamul Gukbap (콩나물국밥), soup made with kongnamul (soybean sprouts), rice
Pimuneojuk (피문어죽)
Kkaejuk (깨죽), sesame porridge
Onuijuk (오누이죽)
Daechujuk (대추죽), jujue porridge
Hapjajuk (합자죽)
Daehapjuk (대합죽)
Naengguksu (냉국수)
Godung Kalguksu (고둥칼국수)

Challyu
Meoukkae guk (머우깨국)
Cheoneotang (천어탕)
Chueotang (추어탕)
Juksunjjim (죽순찜)
Hongeo eosiyuk (홍어어시육)
Bungeo jorim (붕어조림)
Myeolchi jaban (멸치자반)
Duruchigi (두루치기)
Jangeo gui (장어구이)
Sutbul bulgogi (숯불불고기)
Saengchi seopsanjeok (생치섭산적)
Songi sanjeok (송이산적)
Sandwaeji gogi gui (산돼지고기구이)
Aejeo (애저)
Yukhoe (육회)
Hongeohoe (홍어회)
Kkomakhoe (꼬막회)
Jeotgal (젓갈류), fermented salted seafood
Gejang, or marinate raw crabs is a representative speciality of Yeosu.
Saengsan daegu agamijeot (생산대구아가미젓)

Dried fish
Yukpo (육포)
Eopo (어포(민어포)
Daegupo (대구포))

Vegetables
Sanchae (산채)
Gyeoja japchae (겨자잡채)
Totnamul (톳나물)
Parae muchim (파래무침)
Kkolttugi musaengchae (꼴뚜기무생채)
Gatssamji (갓쌈지)
Dodeulppaegi kimchi (고들빼기김치)
Baechupogi kimchi (배추포기김치)
Geomdeul kimchi (검들김치)
Gulkkakdugi (굴깍두기)
Banji (반지(백지))
Gulbi nojeok (굴비노적)
Mareunchan (마른찬(짠 반찬)
Gajuk bugak (가죽부각)
Bugak (부각)
Hwangpomuk (황포묵)

Tteok
Gamsiri tteok (감시리떡), a variety of sirutteok (steamed tteok in a siru pot) made with rice, sugar, azuki bean crumbles, and powdered skins of dried persimmon
Gamgoji tteok (감고지떡), a variety of sirutteok made with rice, sugar, azuki bean crumbles, and thinly sliced dried persimmon
Nabokbyeong (나복병) or called musirutteok (무시루떡), a variety of sirutteok made with rice, sugar, azuki bean crumbles, and radish
Hobak mesiritteok (호박메시리떡)
Bongnyeong tteok (복령떡)), a variety of sirutteok made with rice, sugar, bongnyeong (Poria cocos)
Surichwi tteok (수리취떡(수리취개떡)
Songpi ttteok (송피떡)
Gochi tteok (고치떡)
Bibi songpyeon (삐삐(삘기송편)
Hobakgoji chasirutteok (호박고지차시루떡)
Gaminjeolmi (감인절미)
Gamdanja (감단자)
Jeonju gyeongdan (전주경단)
Haenam gyeongdan (해남경단)
Ujjiji (우찌지)
Chajogi tteok (차조기떡)
Seopjeon (섭전)

Desserts
Sanja (산자, 유과)
Yugwa byeolbeop (유과별법)
Goguma yeot (고구마엿)
Donga jeonggwa (동아정과)
Saenggang jeonggwa (생강정과)
Yeongeun jeonggwa (연근정과)
Yuja hwachae (유자화채), hwachae (punch) made with yuzu, Korean pear, pomegranate
Gotgam sujeonggwa (곶감수정과)

See also
Korean cuisine
Korean royal court cuisine
Korean temple cuisine
List of Korean dishes

References

External links
Official site of Korea National Tourism List of Korean Food 
Food in Korea at the Korea Agro-Fisheries Trade Corporation

Jeolla